Bermondsey Market (also known as New Caledonian Market and Bermondsey Square Antiques Market) is an antiques market at Bermondsey Square on Tower Bridge Road in Bermondsey, south London, England. The location was formerly the site of Bermondsey Abbey.

History
The 15th. Century English Queen Consort of Edward IV, Elizabeth Woodville, lived her last five years in Bermondsey Abbey, dying in 1492.

The Caledonian Market moved to its current location in 1950 after the old Caledonian Market site in Islington was designated for redevelopment in the late 1940s.

Marché ouvert
The opening hours of the Bermondsey Market from 6am until noon (some sources say 4am until 2pm) reflect the ancient law of market ouvert, which was abolished in 1995. Under this law, in a number of designated markets, including Bermondsey Market, if an item was sold between sunrise and sunset then its provenance could not be questioned, so stolen goods could be traded and good title would pass to the purchaser. To quote  Minister for the Arts Estelle Morris in July 2003 during the Second Reading of the Dealing In Cultural Objects (Offences) Bill: 
I did not have information about marché ouvert in the deep recesses of my mind, but experts reliably inform me that it no longer exists. The hon. Member for Uxbridge (Mr. Randall) will be surprised to learn that it has been abolished only recently. It used to exist in designated markets, including Bermondsey. I am sure that the promoter will be interested in telling the hon. Member for Southwark, North and Bermondsey (Simon Hughes) about that. In it, items could be sold before sunrise. Believe it or not, in this land of ours, people could sell stolen—my officials put "dodgy" in brackets, but we do not use that term—objects. I assure hon. Members that it has been abolished. I hope that that deals with the fears of the hon. Member for Uxbridge.

References

External links
 Bermondsey Antiques Market Official Website
 Some photos from Bermondsey market

Retail markets in London
1950 establishments in England
Market